This is a list of ports in Australia. It includes all gazetted ports, harbours, havens, roadsteads and marinas.

This list is complete with respect to the 1996 Gazetteer of Australia. Dubious names have been checked against the online 2004 data, and in all cases confirmed correct. However, if any ports have been gazetted or deleted since 1996, this list does not reflect these changes. Strictly speaking, Australian place names are gazetted in capital letters only; the names in this list have been converted to mixed case in accordance with normal capitalisation conventions. Locations are as gazetted; obviously some islands may extend over large areas.

The list also contains some entries for places that are widely recognised as ports or harbours, yet have not been gazetted as such. These are noted and individually referenced in the list.

New South Wales

Northern Territory

Queensland

South Australia

Tasmania

Victoria

Western Australia

See also
 List of Australian shipyards
 Ports Australia
 Transportation in Australia

References

 
Ports
Australia